The Renault Samsung SM7 is an executive car or full-size car (E-segment in Europe) that was produced by the South Korean manufacturer Renault Samsung Motors from 2004 to 2020.

First generation (EX2)

In October 2002, Renault Samsung Motors started to work on the "EX" project, a new car based on the Nissan J31 platform which shared underpinnings with the Nissan Teana (in Asian markets) and the sixth-generation Nissan Maxima (in Europe, North America and Australia). On 30 November 2004, the new car was revealed to the public as a high-end model. To distinguish it from the Teana various changes were made to the design with the aim of giving it a more solid image.  The car had a significant safety equipment as standard. It was presented in five trim levels: SE, XE, LE, XE35 and RE35.

Engines
The SM7 is fitted with either a 2.3L or 3.5L Neo VQ V6 engine, developed by Nissan. The 2.3L version was fitted to the SE, XE, LE trim levels and the 3.5L to the XE35 and RE35.

2008 facelift
In 2008 a facelifted SM7 called New Art was introduced, with a new front grille and improvements to handling and acceleration. The car dimensions were also slightly changed.

Gallery

Second generation (L47)
 

A new generation SM7, based on a stretched version of the third generation Renault Samsung SM5 (L43), was revealed and went on sale in South Korea since August 2011. A near-production concept version was presented in April. The development of the new car took more than 32 months, at a cost of about 400 billion won (270 million euros). It was conducted by the R & D department of Renault Samsung.

The powertrain consists of two third-generation Nissan VQ engines (of 2.5 and 3.0L) coupled with a 6-speed manual and automatic transmissions. The car has an integrated front bumper-grill with bi-xenon adaptive headlamps an LED lamps on the rear.

Renault Samsung presented three trim levels called SE, LE and RE. The equipment, depending on version, includes three-zone automatic air conditioning, improved ABS system, special headrest, fragrance diffuser, massaging seats, dual-stage airbags, paddle shifting and pressure-sensitive dampers.

Engines

LPG
In August 2015, Renault Samsung introduced a liquified petroleum gas-powered SM7.

2012 facelift
The 2013 model year of the SM7 added a blind spot monitor system, a new satellite navigation and multimedia system and tyre pressure sensors. It also had minor changes to the front grille design.

2014 facelift
In September 2014 Renault Samsung unveiled a facelifted SM7, the SM7 Nova. The car incorporated the renovated design of the company introduced in the QM3, with a new front-end layout. It has a new infotainment system and a "smart mirroring" application.  "Nova" is the Latin word for new star.

Renault Talisman

The Renault Talisman is a revised version of the SM7 sold exclusively in the Chinese market since June 2012, under the Renault marque. It was Renault's flagship saloon in China.

The Talisman takes its name from a 2001 concept car and was unveiled at the 2012 Auto China. The aim of its introduction was to reach the young businessmen.

End of production
According to press reports, Renault Samsung stopped production of the SM7 in late 2019 and all stock was sold by early January 2020. The company removed the car from sale on its website that month.

References

External links

SM7
Executive cars
Full-size vehicles
Sedans
Front-wheel-drive vehicles
Cars introduced in 2004